Columbiana may refer to:

Taxonomy
In botany:
 Arctostaphylos columbiana or hairy manzanita, a plant species native to North America
 Calatola columbiana, a species of plant in the family Icacinaceae endemic to Colombia
 Clematis columbiana, a species of flowering plant in the buttercup genus Clematis
 Crataegus columbiana, a species of hawthorn plant native to North America
 Lewisia columbiana or Columbian lewisia, a species of flowering plant in the purslane family
 Wolffia columbiana or Columbian watermeal, a perennial aquatic plant in the duckweed family

In zoology:
 Columbiana (planthopper), a genus of planthoppers in the subfamily Delphacinae
Dictyna columbiana, a Dictynidae species of spider
Nucifraga columbiana or Clark's nutcracker, a species of passerine bird in the family Corvidae
Sicalis columbiana or orange-fronted yellow-finch, a species of bird in the family Emberizidae
Xylophanes columbiana, a species of moth in the family Sphingidae

Places
In U.S. places:
 Columbiana, Alabama
 Columbiana, Ohio
 Columbiana Exempted Village School District, a school district in Ohio
 Columbiana High School
 Columbiana County, Ohio
 Columbiana County Airport, an airport in Ohio
 Columbiana Centre, a shopping mall in Columbia, South Carolina

See also

 
 
 Central Columbiana and Pennsylvania Railway or Youngstown and Southeastern Railroad
 Colombia (disambiguation)
 Colombian (disambiguation)
 Colombiana (disambiguation)
 Columbia (disambiguation)
 Columbian (disambiguation)